The 2004 Uncle Tobys Hardcourts was a women's tennis tournament played on outdoor hard courts. It was the 8th edition of the event then known as the Uncle Tobys Hardcourts, and was a Tier III event on the 2004 WTA Tour. It took place in Gold Coast, Queensland, Australia, from 4 January through 10 January 2004. First-seeded Ai Sugiyama won the singles title and earned $27,000 first-prize money.

Finals

Singles

 Ai Sugiyama defeated  Nadia Petrova, 1–6, 6–1, 6–4

Doubles

 Svetlana Kuznetsova /  Elena Likhovtseva defeated  Liezel Huber /  Magdalena Maleeva, 6–3, 6–4

External links
 ITF tournament edition details
 Tournament draws

Uncle Tobys Hardcourts
Brisbane International
Uncle Tobys Hardcourts
Uncle Tobys Hardcourts